Manou may refer to:
 Manu (Hinduism), the Hindu progenitor of humanity
 Manou, Eure-et-Loir, a commune in the Eure-et-Loir department in France
 Graham Manou, Australian cricketer
 Manou, a member of the German pop group beFour